La Castellana may refer to:

 La Castellana, Negros Occidental
 La Castellana, Caracas
 La Castellana (TransMilenio)
 Paseo de la Castellana

See also
 Castellana (disambiguation)